Krasnodar is a city in Russia.

Krasnodar may also refer to:
Krasnodar Krai, a federal subject of Russia
Krasnodar Urban Okrug, a municipal formation which the City of Krasnodar in Krasnodar Krai, Russia is incorporated as
Krasnodar International Airport, an airport in Krasnodar, Russia
Krasnodar (K-148), a retired Russian Oscar-class submarine
Krasnodar (B-265), a Russian Kilo-class submarine
MV Krasnodar, several motor vessels
FC Krasnodar, a soccer club from Russia
SKIF Krasnodar, a handball club from Russia
Krasnodar Rora (b. 1945), former Croatian soccer player

See also
Krasnodarsky (disambiguation)
FC Kuban Krasnodar, a soccer club from Russia
FC Krasnodar-2, a soccer club from Krasnodar, Russia
FC Krasnodar-2000, a defunct soccer club from Russia